Anna Hélène Wilhelmina "Heleen" Peerenboom (born 4 February 1980) is a Dutch female former water polo player. She was a member of the Netherlands women's national water polo team. 

She competed with the team at the 2000 Summer Olympics. 
She was also part of the national team at the 2001 Women's European Water Polo Championship and 2003 World Aquatics Championships.

References

External links
 
https://www.rtlnieuws.nl/buurtfacts/opmerkelijk!/olympiers/noord-holland/haarlem///heleen-peerenboom-haarlem
http://www.olympischsporterfgoed.nl/cms/showpage.aspx?id=14133
http://www.volkskrant.nl/archief/waterpolosters-laten-zich-overbluffen-door-canadesen~a582075/
http://www.todor66.com/Water_Polo/Europe/Women_2001.html

1980 births
Living people
Dutch female water polo players
Water polo players at the 2000 Summer Olympics
Olympic water polo players of the Netherlands
Sportspeople from Haarlem